The Caspar CT 1 was a sports aircraft developed in Germany in the early 1920s.

Design and development
Only one CT 1 was built (civil registration D-662), and it took part in the 1925 Deutschen Rundflug.

Variants
CT 1 (D-662), one built.
CT 2(D-673, D-683, D-976) three built
CT 3(D-617), one built for the 1925 Deutschen Rundflug.
CT 4 Two aircraft powered by Daimler D.II engines.
CT 5 Daimler D.I powered, one built by the end of 1925.

Specifications (CT 2)

References

CT01
Biplanes
Single-engined tractor aircraft
Aircraft first flown in 1923